Ene Edet Otudor Otobong (born July 18, 1986 in Douala) is a Cameroonian footballer who currently plays for Egyptian club Misr El-Makasa.

Career
On 1 January 2010 was on trial with Ismaily SC in Egypt. He had a successful trial but could not sign because his club Al-Ittihad could not reach a compromise with Ismaily SC on transfer fees of $120,000. He returned to Al-Ittihad on 13 January 2010. On the 10th of June 2011 Otobong has transferred to Al-Hilal of Sudan. On 7 June 2012 was released by Al Hilal. In the late January 2014, he left Moroccan side Kawkab Marrakech for Egyptian Premier League side Misr El-Makasa, signing a one-and-a-half year deal.
In the late January 2016, he left Egyptian side Misr El-Makasa for KTFF Süper Lig side Küçük Kaymaklı Türk S.K., signing a half year deal.

International career
He also featured in the Cameroon U-23 in All African games.

References

1986 births
Living people
Cameroonian Christians
Cameroonian footballers
Cameroonian expatriate footballers
Les Astres players
Al-Nasr SC (Benghazi) players
Kawkab Marrakech players
Al-Ittihad Aleppo players
Al-Hilal Club (Omdurman) players
Expatriate footballers in Sudan
Expatriate footballers in Syria
Expatriate footballers in Egypt
Expatriate footballers in Libya
Expatriate footballers in Morocco
Cameroonian expatriate sportspeople in Sudan
Cameroonian expatriate sportspeople in Egypt
Cameroonian expatriate sportspeople in Libya
Cameroonian expatriate sportspeople in Morocco
Cameroonian expatriate sportspeople in Syria
Association football forwards
Expatriate footballers in Northern Cyprus
Cameroonian expatriate sportspeople in Northern Cyprus
Syrian Premier League players
Libyan Premier League players